Gabala is a genus of moths in the family Nolidae. The genus was erected by Francis Walker in 1866.

Species
Gabala argentata Butler, 1878 Japan
Gabala australiata Warren, 1916 northern Queensland
Gabala flavicosta Warren, 1916 New Guinea
Gabala flavimargo Warren, 1916 Timor
Gabala grjebinella (Viette, 1956) Comoros
Gabala hilaris Warren, 1916 Sambawa
Gabala margarita Bethune-Baker, 1908 New Guinea
Gabala polyspilalis Walker, [1866] India
Gabala quadrinigrata Warren, 1916 Kai Kecil
Gabala sanguinata Warren, 1916 Java

References

Taxa named by Francis Walker (entomologist)
Chloephorinae